Clermontia pyrularia is a rare species of flowering plant in the bellflower family known by the common names Hamakua clermontia and pear clermontia. It is one of several Hawaiian lobelioids in genus Clermontia that are known as oha wai and haha. It is endemic to the island of Hawaii, where there is one remaining wild population containing 15 individuals and several propagated individuals that have been planted in protected habitat. This is a federally listed endangered species of the United States.

Associated plants include Lythrum maritimum and Rubus hawaiensis. It has toothed leaf blades borne on winged petioles. The plant blooms in November and December in greenish white double-lipped flowers with green-tipped sepals. Pear-shaped fruits occur soon after.

Threats to this rare plant include feral pigs, black rats, and introduced plant species such as banana passionfruit (Passiflora mollissima), weeping rice grass (Ehrharta stipoides), and kikuyu grass (Pennisetum clandestinum). The plant also likely suffers from the loss of several native nectar-feeding birds which once pollinated it, and fruit-eating birds which dispersed its seeds.

A few populations have been planted in Hakalau National Wildlife Refuge.

References

External links

USDA Plants Profile

Mauna Loa
pyrularia
Endemic flora of Hawaii
Biota of Hawaii (island)
Plants described in 1888